D52 state road, located in Lika region of Croatia connecting cities and towns of Otočac and Korenica, to the state road network of Croatia, and to  A1 motorway at Otočac interchange (via D50.

The D50 state road runs parallel to a section of the A1 motorway between Žuta Lokva and Sveti Rok interchanges, thus serving as an alternate or backup route for the motorway.

The road, as well as all other state roads in Croatia, is managed and maintained by Hrvatske ceste, a state-owned company.

Traffic volume 

Traffic is regularly counted and reported by Hrvatske ceste, operator of the road.  Substantial variations between annual (AADT) and summer (ASDT) traffic volumes at some counting sites are attributed to the fact that the road connects to D1 and D50 which in turn provide connections to other major highways carrying tourist traffic.

Road junctions and populated areas

Sources

D052
D052